Canadian National class N-4 steam locomotives were of 2-8-0 wheel arrangement in the Whyte notation, or 1′D in UIC classification. These locomotives were built for the Grand Trunk Railway (GT) from 1906 until GT began purchasing class M freight locomotives in 1913.

The Grand Trunk started to rebuild and reclassify them; superheated compounds became class D3; those rebuilt with  simple expansion cylinders and Stephenson valve gear became classes D4, D5 and D6. The D4 was extinct by the 1923 takeover of the Grand Trunk by Canadian National Railway; CN reclassified the others as N-4-a and N-4-b respectively. Some locomotives received Walschaerts valve gear and were classified D7 (N-4-d and N-4-e) and D9 (N-4-c); two received Young valve gear and were classified D11 (N-4-f). All simpled locomotives had their boiler pressure reduced to 

Both GT and CN took some of these rebuilding efforts out of their original numerical sequence. CN numbered class N-4-a locomotives from 2525 through 2660 and numbered the alternative rebuilding classes from 2661 through 2686. The rebuilt simplified locomotives remained in freight service until the final replacement of steam with diesel locomotives.

Three N-4-a class locomotives have been preserved:
Number 2534 (ex-GT 640, MLW 40587 of 1906) was initially preserved in Zwick Island Park, Belleville, Ontario, but moved to Memory Junction Railway Museum in Brighton, Ontario in 1997;
Number 2601 (ex-GT 746, MLW 43160 of 1907) in the Canadian Railway Historical Association Museum at Delson, Quebec; and
Number 2616 (ex-GT 767, Alco-Brooks 49664 of 1911) by the Kiwanis in Haliburton, Ontario.

References 

2-8-0 locomotives
ALCO locomotives
MLW locomotives
N-4
Freight locomotives
Grand Trunk Railway
Railway locomotives introduced in 1906